was a town located in Kōka District, Shiga Prefecture, Japan.

As of 2004, the town had an estimated population of 9,007 and a density of 71.37 persons per km². The total area is 126.2 km².

On October 1, 2004, Tsuchiyama and the towns of Kōka, Kōnan, Minakuchi and Shigaraki (all from Kōka District), were merged to create the city of Kōka.

Tsuchiyama is famous for Tsuchiyama-juku, one of the 53 post stations along the Tokaido road and for its production of green tea.  Kōka city produces 80% of all green tea in Shiga Prefecture.

The sister city of Tsuchiyama is Traverse City, Michigan, United States.

Climate

References

External links 

 Koka Sightseeing Guide

Kōka, Shiga
Dissolved municipalities of Shiga Prefecture